Marianne Matuzic Myles (born in 1953, Lackawanna, New York) was the US Ambassador to the Republic of Cape Verde(2008-2011)

Education
Myles earned a bachelor's degree in economics from the State University of New York at Oswego (1975), a Masters in Public Administration from Harvard University and a Masters of Science in National Security Strategy from the National Defense University.

Career
She served as dean of the State Department's School of Language Studies in Washington, D.C.

Personal life
Myles is married to retired Foreign Service Officer Stan Myles.

References

External links

People from Lackawanna, New York
Harvard Kennedy School alumni
Ambassadors of the United States to Cape Verde
State University of New York at Oswego alumni
National Defense University alumni
Living people
American women ambassadors
1953 births
21st-century American women